Free Man is a studio album by Jamaican reggae singer Burning Spear, released in 2003.

It was nominated for a Grammy Award for Best Reggae Album at the 46th Grammy Awards in 2004.

Track listing
"Trust"
"We Feel It"
"Ha Ha"
"Not Guilty"
"Rock and Roll"
"Hey Dready"
"Freeman"
"Loved For Who I Am"
"Rise Up"
"Old School"
"They Can't"
"Changes"

Credits
All songs written by Winston Rodney
Published by Burning Spear Publishing
Recorded, Mixed, Edited and Mastered by Chris Daley at MVP (The New Harry J) Studio, 10 Roosevelt Ave., Kingston, Jamaica, WI
"Old School" and "They Can't" Recorded by Stephen Stewart
Assistant Engineer: Khabier Bonner
Remastered by George Marino at Sterling Sound NY, NY
Photography: Mark Seliger
Design: Helicopter
Listening Panel: Elise Kelly, Basil Walters, Roland Reid, Sonia Rodney, T. Boots Harris, Stephen Stewart
Special Thanks to all the musicians who worked on this project, engineer, assistant engineer and listening panel, all the fans all over the world, Mrs. Sonia Rodney, Marl Seliger, Brother Asher, Michael Sauvage and Roger Steffen, Garrett Vandermollen.

Musicians
Burning Spear - lead vocals, percussion, background vocals
Leroy "Horsemouth" Wallace - drums
Shawn "Mark" Dawson - drums
Dillon White - drums
Chris Meredith - bass
Ian "Beezy" Coleman - bass, rhythm guitar, lead guitar
Stephen Stewart - keyboards
Leebert "Gibby" Morrison - lead guitar
Robert Browne - lead guitar
Uziah "Sticky" Thompson - percussion
Christopher "Skyjuice" Burth - percussion
Chico Chin - trumpet
Everton Gayle - saxophone
Barry Bailey - trombone
Delton Browne - background vocals
Paul "Lymie" Murray - background vocals
Pam Hall - background vocals
Michael "Lukie D" Kennedy - background vocals
Anthony Selassie - background vocals
Jeoffrey "Star" Forrest - background vocals

Burning Spear albums
2003 albums